Mónaco Airport  is an airstrip  north of Pichilemu, a Pacific coastal city in the O'Higgins Region of Chile.

The "SCMN" ICAO code was formerly assigned to the closed Mansel Airport.

See also

Transport in Chile
List of airports in Chile

References

External links
OpenStreetMap - Mónaco Airport

Airports in Pichilemu
Airports in Chile